The Pakistan Netball Federation (PNF) is the national governing body to develop and promote the sport of netball in Pakistan. The Federation was formed in 1996.

The PNF organizes the National Netball Championships annually.

Affiliations
The Federation is affiliated with:
 International Netball Federation
 Asian Federation of Netball Associations
 Pakistan Olympic Association
 Pakistan Sports Board

References

External links
 Official Website

Netball governing bodies in Asia
Sports governing bodies in Pakistan
Netball in Pakistan
Sports organizations established in 1996
1996 establishments in Pakistan
Pak